The Bodanrück is the peninsula that divides Lake Constance into Überlinger See and Gnadensee, which is part of Untersee.

The cities of Konstanz, Radolfzell and Allensbach are located there.

External links 
Konstanz.de/Tourismus

Landforms of Baden-Württemberg
Peninsulas of Germany
Geography of Lake Constance